was a Japanese politician of the Liberal Democratic Party, a member of the House of Councillors in the Diet (national legislature). A native of Kagoshima, Kagoshima and high school graduate, he had served in the city assembly of Kagoshima for four terms since 1976. He was elected to the House of Councillors for the first time in 2001.

References

External links 
  in Japanese.

Members of the House of Councillors (Japan)
1938 births
2018 deaths
People from Kagoshima
Japanese municipal councilors
Politicians from Kagoshima Prefecture
Liberal Democratic Party (Japan) politicians